The Commissioner for Environment, Oceans and Fisheries is a member of the European Commission. The current Commissioner is Virginijus Sinkevičius, who also serves as EU Commissioner for the Environment.

Environment

The European Union has made a number of environmental moves, partially in regard to climate change. Most notably it signed the Kyoto Protocol in 1998, set up its Emission Trading Scheme in 2005 and is currently agreeing to unilaterally cut its net emissions of greenhouse gases by at least 55% by 2030 compared to 1990s levels. (See: Energy policy of the European Union)

Other policies include Natura 2000, a widespread and successful network of nature conservation sites, the Registration, Evaluation and Authorisation of Chemicals (REACH) directive requiring safety testing on widely used chemicals, and the Water Framework Directive ensuring water quality reaches higher standards.

Fisheries
The portfolio includes policies such as the Common Fisheries Policy, which is largely a competence of the European Union rather than the members. The Union has 66,000 km of coastline and the largest Exclusive Economic Zone in the world, covering 25 million km2. They also participate in meetings of the Agriculture and Fisheries Council (Agrifish) configuration of the Council of the European Union.

Former commissioners

Karmenu Vella
2014-2019 the Commissioner was Karmenu Vella of Malta. In his hearing before the Committee on the Environment, Public Health and Food Safety and the Committee on Fisheries, and in his introductory statement to the European Parliament, Vella listed as his priorities Green Growth, protection of natural capital, and safeguarding the Union's citizens from environment related
pressures and risks to health.

Stavros Dimas
During his hearing with the European Parliament, Stavros Dimas announced four main priorities for his term in office: climate change, biodiversity, public health and sustainability; Highlighting the importance of the Kyoto Protocol, the Natura 2000 project, the REACH directive, and the need to better enforce existing EU environmental legislation. On Dimas' website he lists the following key policy areas; Air, Biotechnology, Chemicals, Civil Protection and Environmental Accidents, Climate Change, Environmental Technologies, Health, International Issues and Enlargement, Nature and Biodiversity, Noise, Soil, Sustainable Development, Urban Environment, Waste and Water.

At the UN's Buenos Aires talks on climate change in December 2004 he attempted to negotiate mandatory emissions reductions to follow the expiration of Kyoto in 2012. This met with opposition from the US, whose representatives refused to discuss it.

Dimas oversaw the introduction of the EU's emissions trading scheme that took effect on 1 January 2005, despite emissions reduction plans from Poland, Italy, the Czech Republic and Greece not having been approved on time. He also sought to include companies operating aircraft under the emissions trading regime.

In February 2007 the Commissioner put forward his plans to increase fuel efficiency standards of cars so that emissions are no more than 130g of CO2 per km, down from 162g/km in 2005. This caused anger from the European car industry which was stoked by the Commissioner requesting a Japanese car, a Toyota Prius, instead of a European make due to the Toyota's better environmental standards. 

In response to the refusal of countries to ratify the Kyoto Protocol, such as the United States and Australia (the latter of which exchanged viewpoints with the EU on the matter), the EU has been looking to tax products imported from those countries not taking low-carbon policies on board (Border Tax Adjustments). (Australia has since ratified the Kyoto Protocol, at the Bali COP in December 2007).

Carlo Ripa di Meana
Carlo Ripa di Meana was appointed Environment Commissioner in 1990 which coincided with increased public interest and awareness in environmental issues. Ripa di Meana's appointment took place at the same time as that of a new Directorate-General, Brinkhorst. They both tried to change the image of DG XI (now DG Environment) in charge of environmental issues and make it a more mainstream actor. According to Schön-Quinlivan the then president of the commission, Jacques Delors, did not appreciate Ripa di Meana's political style and their relationship became strained. Ripa di Meana was eventually replaced by Karel Van Miert for a period of six months until a full-time replacement could be found. Yet Van Miert supported what had been done before him and described environmental policy as 'one of our most successful policies, and one of the best understood'.

Joe Borg
Commissioner Borg was approved by the European Parliament in 2004 and served until 2010. His two main priorities were "setting the European Union on the path towards a European Maritime Policy" and "securing the ecological, economic and social sustainability of the European fishing and aquaculture industry" 

On 7 June 2006 the European Commission published a green paper on a future Maritime Policy and opened a consultation that ended in June 2007
. 
The green paper addressed a number of issues such as sustainable development, protection of the environment, skills and employment, technology and resources, coastal safety and tourism, financial support and heritage.
On 10 October 2007 the European Commission presented its vision for an integrated maritime policy with a detailed action plan
The Commission came under fire in May 2007 for not penalising French fishermen for over-fishing the threatened bluefin tuna by 65% while backing penalties on Irish fishermen for over-fishing mackerel

List of commissioners

Environment

Agriculture, Rural Development and Fisheries

Maritime Affairs and Fisheries
(or Fisheries and Maritime Affairs)

Environment, Maritime Affairs and Fisheries

See also

Environment
 Directorate-General for the Environment
 EU environmental policy
 European Environment Agency
 Coordination of Information on the Environment
 Global warming and Kyoto Protocol:
 European Climate Change Programme
 European Union Emission Trading Scheme
 Renewable energy in the European Union
 Transport in the European Union
 Water supply and sanitation in the European Union
 Water Framework Directive
 REACH directive
 Geography of the European Union
 Natura 2000
 Common Agricultural Policy

Fisheries
 Directorate-General for Maritime Affairs and Fisheries
 Common Fisheries Policy
 Agriculture and Fisheries Council (Council of the European Union)
 Directorate-General for Agriculture, Fisheries, Social Affairs and Health
 European Parliament Committee on Fisheries
 European Fisheries Control Agency

External links
 Commissioner's Website
 Commission Fisheries Website
 Commissioner Dimas' website
 Commission's Environment website
Eurostat – Statistics Explained – all articles on environment
 Celebrating the Environmental Union (Stavros Dimas)

References

Maritime affairs and Fisheries
European Union fishing regulations